Dehnow-e Yek (also known as Deh Now) is a village in Chahar Gonbad Rural District, in the Central District of Sirjan County, Kerman Province, Iran. At the 2006 census, its population was 10, in 4 families.

References 

Populated places in Sirjan County